Teatro ZinZanni is a circus dinner theater that began in the neighborhood of Lower Queen Anne in Seattle, Washington. It has since expanded to a site on the waterfront at Pier 29 on The Embarcadero in San Francisco, California.

History 
Teatro ZinZanni was created by Norman Langill, and was once described as "the Moulin Rouge meets Cirque du Soleil." The show is a blend of European circus and cabaret  and American vaudeville performed in a Belgian spiegeltent (mirror tent).  Until mid-2011 the show was produced by the Seattle-based non-profit events company, One Reel. Teatro Zinzanni is now an independent company.

Teatro ZinZanni began in Seattle in October 1998 for an eight-week run and ended up playing to sold-out houses until it closed on December 31, 1999. Members of the original cast included tap dancer Wayne Doba, also known for being San Francisco Giants mascot the Crazy Crab, Kevin Kent, and Ann Wilson of the rock group Heart.  It then moved its operation to San Francisco, opening there in March 2000. In 2002, it reopened a permanent operation in Seattle's Belltown district. The operation has since moved to Seattle's theatre district on Mercer Street across from Seattle Center. As of 2017, Teatro ZinZanni has moved To Redmond WA, in the Marymoor Park Area. This is said to be a temporary location through April 2018, at which time they will move to a permanent location. 
Teatro ZinZanni's San Francisco location closed its operation on December 31, 2011, due to the city's preparation for the America's Cup, but has plan to reopen at another location on the Embarcadero after fund-raising is complete.

Teatro ZinZanni opened a Chicago location in the downtown theatre district above the James M. Nederlander Theatre in 2019. The show closed in July 2022.

The many performers in Teatro ZinZanni productions have included Joan Baez, Andrea Conway,  Duffy Bishop, Yamil Borges, Kevin Kent, Martha Davis of the rock group The Motels, Michael Davis, El Vez, Frank Ferrante, Geoff Hoyle, Sally Kellerman, Liliane Montevecchi, Maria Muldaur, Melanie Stace, Puddles Pity Party. 

Although first billed as individual performers Andrea Conway and Wayne Doba later appear in several productions as real life husband and wife tap-dancing vaudeville comedy duo “Dik and Mitzi”.  

Teatro ZinZanni has produced two CDs:  The Divas,  with Baez, Montevecchi, Kellerman, Thelma Houston and others, and Omnium, a collaboration of TZ Maestro Norm Durkee with Martha Davis.

In addition to Teatro ZinZanni's evening dinner shows, Teatro ZinZanni has introduced a variety of special projects including brunches, late-night cabarets (Cabaret Lunatique, Mezzo Lunatico), a concert series (Mirror Tent Music), children's/family programming (Big Top Rock, "Zirkus Fantazmo") and offers year-round education opportunities including day camps.

See also
 List of dinner theaters

References

External links

 
 One Reel website.

Circuses
Dinner theatre
Restaurants in San Francisco
Tourist attractions in San Francisco
Restaurants established in 1998
1998 establishments in Washington (state)